The 1928 Nobel Prize in Literature was awarded to the Danish-born Norwegian novelist Sigrid Undset (1882–1949) "principally for her powerful descriptions of Northern life during the Middle Ages." She is the third female recipient of the literature prize.

Laureate

Sigrid Undset's writing career started by focusing on strong, contemporary women struggling for emancipation. Inspired by his archeologist father, she later turned to writing about the Middle Ages as seen in Fortællingen om Viga-Ljot og Vigdis ("Gunnar's Daughter", 1909) and tetralogy Olav Audunssøn i Hestviken og Olav Audunssøn og Hans Børn ("The Master of Hestviken", 1925–27). Her best known work is Kristin Lavransdatter (1920–1922), which deals with themes of honor, religious faith, and the common life shared by women and men in 15th-century Norway. According to the Swedish Academy, Undset brings to life the medieval times with solid historical knowledge, deep psychological insight, a vivid imagination, and a vigorous language. Being a convert to Catholicism, she expressed her religiosity by writing a biographical novel on St. Catherine of Siena and a hagiographical collection Sagaen om de Hellige ("Saga of Saints", 1934).

Deliberations

Nominations
Sigrid Undset was only nominated in four occasions (1922, 1925, 1926, and 1928). Her last nomination which led to her being awarded the Nobel prize came from the proposal of the Norwegian psychologist Helga Eng (1875–1966).

In total, the Swedish Academy received 48 nominations for 36 individuals. Thirteen of the nominees were newly nominated such as Hans Driesch, Ricarda Huch, Felix Timmermans,  Theodor Däubler, Armando Palacio Valdés, Rufino Blanco Fombona, Blanca de los Ríos, Anna de Noailles, and Edith Howes. The highest number of nominations (with three nomination letters each) were for the German writer Paul Ernst and the French philosopher Henri Bergson (awarded for 1927). There were six female nominees: Blanca de los Ríos, Edith Howes, Ricarda Huch, Edith Wharton, Concha Espina de la Serna, and Anna de Noailles. 

The authors Ryūnosuke Akutagawa, Vicente Blasco Ibáñez, François de Curel, Robert de Flers, Edmund Gosse, Avery Hopwood, Oskar Jerschke, Henry Festing Jones, Juan Bautista Justo, Ladislav Klíma, Charlotte Mew, Barry Pain, Frank Ramsey, George Ranetti, José Eustasio Rivera, Max Scheler, Aron Hector Schmitz (known as Italo Svevo), Antonín Sova, Sir George Trevelyan, Paul van Ostaijen, Stanley John Weyman, and Elinor Wylie died without having been nominated for the prize.

Notes

References

External links
 Presentation Speech by Per Hallström nobelprize.org

1928